Prothoosuchus is an extinct genus of trematosaurian temnospondyl within the family Thoosuchidae.

See also
 Prehistoric amphibian
 List of prehistoric amphibians

Trematosaurs